The Clarkson Golden Knights women's ice hockey program represented Clarkson University during the 2016–17 NCAA Division I women's ice hockey season. The Golden Knights entered the season following their second Frozen Four appearance the previous season.

After a slow start, the Golden Knights rebounded to win their third ECAC Regular Season title in four years. They followed this with their first ever ECAC tournament championship, defeating Cornell by a score of 1–0. In the NCAA Tournament, the Golden Knights advanced to their second title game, which they won 3–0 over top-ranked Wisconsin for the program's second national title. In addition to the postseason championships, the Golden Knights also won an in-season tournament for the first time, winning the Windjammer Classic at Vermont on Thanksgiving weekend.

Offseason

Coaching changes
The offseason saw the departure of two-year assistant coach Meghan Duggan, who left to concentrate on preparing for the Winter Olympics in two years time. Her role was filled by Tony Maci, who had previously served as an assistant coach at Adrian College and Princeton.

Recruiting

Roster

Schedule

|-
!colspan=12 style=""| Regular Season

|-
!colspan=12 style=""| ECAC Hockey Tournament

|-
!colspan=12 style=""| NCAA Tournament

Awards and honors

 Genevieve Bannon – NCAA All-Tournament Team, Second Team All-USCHO.com, ECAC Hockey Second Team All-Star, ECAC Hockey weekly Honor Roll (11/1, 11/22, 1/24, 2/6)
 Loren Gabel – ECAC Hockey All-Tournament Team, ECAC Hockey Player of the Week (3/5), ECAC Hockey weekly Honor Roll (11/7, 2/14)
 Savannah Harmon – NCAA All-Tournament Team, Second Team AHCA All-American, Second Team All-USCHO.com, Patty Kazmaier Memorial Award nominee, ECAC Hockey First Team All-Star, ECAC Hockey Player of the Year finalist, ECAC Hockey Best Defenseman, ECAC Hockey weekly Honor Roll (10/25)
 Corie Jacobson – ECAC Hockey weekly Honor Roll (10/11)
 McKenzie Johnson – ECAC Hockey Goaltender of the Week (12/13), ECAC Hockey weekly Honor Roll (11/15, 1/17)
 Ryhen McGill – ECAC Hockey All-Tournament Team, ECAC Hockey weekly Honor Roll (11/15)
 Cayley Mercer – Patty Kazmaier Memorial Award finalist, USCHO.com Player of the Year, NCAA Tournament Most Outstanding Player, NCAA All-Tournament Team, First Team AHCA All-American, First Team All-USCHO.com, ECAC Hockey Player of the Year, ECAC Hockey All-Tournament Team, ECAC Hockey First Team All-Star, ECAC Hockey Best Forward, ECAC Hockey Player of the Month (February, March), ECAC Hockey Player of the Week (12/5, 1/31, 2/21), ECAC Hockey weekly Honor Roll (12/13, 1/24)
 Michaela Pejzlova – ECAC Hockey All-Rookie Team, ECAC Hockey Rookie of the Week (11/7, 11/15), ECAC Hockey weekly Honor Roll (10/25, 11/1, 11/22, 1/17, 2/21), Windjammer Classic All-Tournament Team
 Ella Shelton – USCHO.com All-Rookie Team, ECAC Hockey All-Tournament Team, ECAC Hockey Third Team All-Star, ECAC Hockey All-Rookie Team, ECAC Hockey All-Rookie Team, ECAC Hockey Rookie of the Month (December, March), ECAC Hockey Rookie of the Week (3/5), ECAC Hockey weekly Honor Roll (12/6, 12/13, 1/31, 2/6, 2/14)
 Shea Tiley – Second Team All-USCHO.com, ECAC Hockey Tournament Most Outstanding Player, ECAC Hockey Third Team All-Star, ECAC Hockey Goaltender of the Year finalist, ECAC Hockey Goaltender of the Month (February, March), ECAC Hockey Goaltender of the Week (2/14, 3/5), ECAC Hockey weekly Honor Roll (10/25, 11/1, 11/22, 11/29, 12/6, 1/31, 2/6, 2/21)
 Taylor Turnquist – ECAC Hockey weekly Honor Roll (11/29)
 Cassidy Vinkle – ECAC Hockey weekly Honor Roll (11/29, 1/17), Windjammer Classic Most Valuable Player, Windjammer Classic All-Tournament Team

References

Clarkson
Clarkson Golden Knights women's ice hockey seasons
NCAA women's ice hockey Frozen Four seasons
NCAA women's ice hockey championship seasons